At the 1912 Summer Olympics, nine swimming events were contested. Swimming events were held in a 100 m course built in Stockholm harbor. For the first time, women's events were part of the Olympic swimming program. The competitions were held from Saturday July 6, 1912, to Friday July 12, 1912.  There was a total of 120 participants from 17 countries competing.

Medal table

Medal summary

Men's events

Women's events

Participating nations
A total of 120 swimmers (93 men and 27 women) from 17 nations (men from 17 nations - women from 8 nations) competed at the Stockholm Games:

  (men:7 women:2)
  (men:3 women:5)
  (men:4 women:1)
  (men:1 women:0)
  (men:1 women:0)
  (men:4 women:2)
  (men:3 women:0)
  (men:13 women:4)
  (men:12 women:6)
  (men:1 women:0)
  (men:8 women:0)
  (men:2 women:0)
  (men:4 women:1)
  (men:4 women:0)
  (men:1 women:0)
  (men:18 women:6)
  (men:7 women:0)

References

 
 
 

 
1912 Summer Olympics events
1912
1912 in swimming